This is the progression of world record improvements of the 1500 metres W90 division of Masters athletics.

Key

Masters athletics world record progressions